Śródka may refer to the following places:
Śródka, Poznań, a historic district in the city of Poznań
Śródka, Poznań County, a village 18 km south-east of Poznań
Śródka, Międzychód County, a village 52 km north-west of Poznań
Śródka, Warmian-Masurian Voivodeship, a village in northern Poland